Hólmfríður "Fríða" Magnúsdóttir (born 20 September 1984) is an Icelandic former footballer who played as a left winger or as an attacking midfielder. Hólmfríður was a part of Iceland's national team from 2003 to 2020 and represented her country at the 2009 and 2013 editions of the UEFA Women's Championship.

Club career
At the 2009 WPS International Draft, Hólmfríður was picked fifth by the Philadelphia Independence, one of two expansion teams entering Women's Professional Soccer (WPS). She was often deployed as a left back by coach Paul Riley and made 31 appearances in two seasons with the Independence, scoring four goals.

During her second season, 2011, Hólmfríður struggled with fitness after being injured and was allowed to move back to Iceland with Valur. Philadelphia brought her back for 2012, but the league folded before the campaign began. Instead Hólmfríður accepted a contract from ambitious Norwegian club Avaldsnes IL, then languishing in the First Division. During her stay with Avaldsnes, she was sexually harassed and stalked by her coach, Tom Nordlie, which led to his firing.

In November 2016, Hólmfríður rejoined her hometown club, KR.

Hólmfríður sat out the 2018 season due to pregnancy. After contemplating retiring, she signed with Úrvalsdeild kvenna club Selfoss in April 2019, and started training five days before the 2019 Úrvalsdeild season started. On 17 August 2019, Hólmfríður scored in Selfoss' 2–1 victory against KR in the Icelandic Cup finals, securing the club's first major trophy.

In September 2020, Hólmfríður returned to Norway and signed with Avaldsnes again. She finished the season with Avaldsnes, scoring one goal in four games, before returning to Selfoss in December 2020. She appeared in one game in the Icelandic Women's Football League Cup on 28 February 2021.

On 16 March 2021, Hólmfríður announced her retirement from football. A month later, she reversed her decision and decided to return to Selfoss. She appeared in eleven matches, scoring three goals, before the club announced on 17 August that due to being pregnant with her second child she would be leaving the team and be retiring from football.

International career

Hólmfríður made her senior international debut for Iceland in a 1–0 friendly defeat to the United States on 16 February 2003.

In Iceland's UEFA Women's Euro 2009 qualifying play-off against the Republic of Ireland, Hólmfríður scored in the first minute of the first leg in Dublin. At the final tournament, she played in all three group matches as Iceland were eliminated in the first round.

National team coach Siggi Eyjólfsson selected Hólmfríður in his Iceland squad for UEFA Women's Euro 2013. Again she featured in all three group matches but collected two yellow cards and was suspended for Iceland's 4–0 quarter-final defeat to hosts Sweden.

In October 2020, Hólmfríður was selected to the national team squad for the first time in three years, replacing injured Dagný Brynjarsdóttir.

References

External links

1984 births
Living people
Holmfridur Magnusdottir
Holmfridur Magnusdottir
Philadelphia Independence players
Expatriate women's footballers in Denmark
Expatriate women's footballers in Norway
Kristianstads DFF players
Damallsvenskan players
Fortuna Hjørring players
Holmfridur Magnusdottir
Avaldsnes IL players
Toppserien players
Expatriate women's footballers in Sweden
Expatriate women's soccer players in the United States
Holmfridur Magnusdottir
Holmfridur Magnusdottir
Holmfridur Magnusdottir
Holmfridur Magnusdottir
Holmfridur Magnusdottir
Holmfridur Magnusdottir
Women's association football midfielders
FIFA Century Club
Holmfridur Magnusdottir
Holmfridur Magnusdottir
Holmfridur Magnusdottir
Women's Professional Soccer players
UEFA Women's Euro 2017 players